John S. Thorp Jr. (September 29, 1925 – November 15, 1995) was an American politician who served in the New York State Assembly from 1965 to 1976.

He died of pulmonary fibrosis on November 15, 1995, in Rockville Centre, New York at age 70.

References

1925 births
1995 deaths
Democratic Party members of the New York State Assembly
20th-century American politicians